Alexis Cohen (October 17, 1983 – July 5, 2009) was a two-time reality TV show contestant and singer on American Idol who directed an expletive-filled televised rant at the show's judges after comparing her singing style to vocalists Grace Slick, Janis Joplin, and Pat Benatar. She was called "Glitter Girl" in the media.

Education
Cohen was a graduate of East Stroudsburg North High School and attended Montgomery Community College and studied to be a veterinarian. She lived in Allentown, Pennsylvania with her mother, Mindy Dallow.

Singing career
Cohen's first audition on American Idol was in 2008 during Season Seven in Philadelphia, where she sang "Somebody to Love" by Jefferson Airplane. All three judges voted no, eliminating her from the competition. Cohen returned for a second audition in 2009 for Idol'''s Season Eight in Boston, singing "Like a Prayer" by Madonna. She again reacted negatively on camera after judge Simon Cowell called her performance "horrendous".

Death

On July 5, 2009, Cohen was struck by a hit and run driver in Seaside Heights, New Jersey. Her body was found by two passersby along a road about 4am. Paramedics performed lifesaving efforts before they arrived with Cohen at Community Medical Center in Toms River, where she was pronounced dead at 6:35am. 

Daniel Bark, aged 27, was later arrested and indicted for drunk and reckless driving, manslaughter, and leaving the scene of an accident. Bark, who had a previous 2004 DUI conviction, was fleeing police when he struck and killed Cohen after failing to stop when a bicycle patrol officer ordered him to do so. In November 2011, Bark accepted a plea agreement and pleaded guilty to eluding police and drunk driving. Prosecutors dismissed manslaughter and other charges in the deadly traffic accident. A judge quashed Bark's confession because police failed to advise him of his rights.

Cohen's death was covered by People Magazine, Entertainment Weekly, MTV, Rolling Stone, ABC News, The New York Daily News'', and other national media.

Cohen was interred at Keneseth Israel Cemetery in Allentown, Pennsylvania.

References

External links

Obituary at BBC

1983 births
2009 deaths
American Idol participants
Road incident deaths in New Jersey
Pedestrian road incident deaths
Musicians from Brooklyn
Musicians from Allentown, Pennsylvania
People from Montgomery County, Pennsylvania
20th-century American singers
20th-century American women singers
21st-century American women singers
21st-century American singers